The Passaic-class ironclad monitors of the U.S. Navy saw service in the U.S. Civil War and the Spanish–American War. The class was an improved version of  equipped with a 15-inch Dahlgren gun in place of one of the 11-inch guns.

Design

Naval architect and engineer John Ericsson designed the Passaic-class warships, drawing upon lessons learned from the first , which he also designed. The Passaic monitors were larger than the original Monitor and had their pilothouses atop the turret, rather than near the bow. This allowed a wider field of view and easier communications between captain, pilot and crew. The shape of the hull was an improvement; a fuller and rounder lower hull, far more boat-like than that of the Monitor, and with a less pronounced overhang. The Passaic class featured an  funnel and improved ventilation. In combination, the significant hydrodynamic refinements and improved draught to the boilers resulted in a one-knot speed increase over the prototype monitor, despite the Passaic having a lower specific power than Monitor (Passaic being almost 400 tons heavier and yet with the same 320ihp-rated machinery). 

Having observed the new 15-inch Rodman cannon in fortifications and disappointed with the performance of the 11-inch Dahlgren versus , Assistant Secretary of the Navy Gustavus Fox required the new monitors to be equipped with at least one gun of 15-inch caliber, resulting in rush production of a new 15-inch Dahlgren. The large volume of propellant gases released inside the turret required the addition of a "smoke box" at the muzzle in the interior of the turret. Lehigh had her 11-inch smoothbore replaced with an 8-inch Parrott rifle. Passaic also had this modification by July 1863, and, eventually, all surviving members of this class had an additional 15-inch smoothbore added.
Later improvements included an additional 50 tons of deck plating over the magazines and machinery spaces as well as rings fitted around the turret and pilot houses to prevent their pivoting machinery from being jammed by shot.

Ships in class
Warships of Passaic class included:

 Passaic
 Montauk
 Nahant
 Patapsco
 Weehawken
 Sangamon
 Catskill
 Nantucket
 Lehigh
 Camanche

The first ship of the class was named for the city of Passaic, New Jersey.

See also
 , an Imperial Russian Navy monitor type built to the plans of the American Passaic class.

Notes

References

 
 
 
 
 

Monitor classes